The Pila Historic Town Center is a historic district located at Barangay Santa Clara Norte, Pila, Laguna, Philippines. The district preserves examples of Spanish and American-era architecture found in its town proper laid out with the Spanish colonial town planning system for the Indies and is also a pre-Hispanic archaeological site. The National Historical Institute (now the National Historical Commission of the Philippines) declared a specific portion of Pila as a National Historical Landmark in 2000.

Rationale for Declaration as Historic Town Center
The NHI board resolution cites several reasons for the declaration of certain areas in downtown Pila as National Historical Landmark:
The present-day town of Pila is a pre-Hispanic center of culture and trade in the Laguna area as proven by clay potteries unearthed in an archaeological site in Pinagbayanan in 1967;
Spaniards used to refer to Pila as La Noble Villa de Pila in reference to its well-mannered citizens and rich culture;
As of writing, Pila is one of the few, existing towns in the Philippines following the Spanish colonial town planning system with the town center being the plaza complex surrounded by government and religious infrastructure; and
Pila features a collection of well-preserved of Spanish and American-era houses, government structures, and church.

Declared Areas
According to the board resolution, the following streets in Brgy. Santa Clara Norte are identified as part of Pila Historic Town Center:

Notable Built Heritage

|}

See also
 Philippine Registry of Cultural Property

References

External links
 List of Board Resolutions of the National Historical Commission of the Philippines
 Republic Act No. 10066 - National Cultural Heritage Act of 2009

Heritage Houses in the Philippines
National Historical Landmarks of the Philippines